Francesco Primaticcio (April 30, 1504 – 1570) was an Italian Mannerist  painter, architect and sculptor who spent most of his career in France.

Biography
Born in Bologna, he trained under Giulio Romano in Mantua and became a pupil of Innocenzo da Imola, executing decorations at the Palazzo Te before securing a position in the court of Francis I of France in 1532.

Together with Rosso Fiorentino he was one of the leading artists to work at the Chateau Fontainebleau (where he is grouped with the so-called "First School of Fontainebleau") spending much of his life there. Following Rosso's death in 1540, Primaticcio took control of the artistic direction at Fontainebleau, furnishing the painters and stuccators of his team, such as Nicolò dell'Abate, with designs. He made cartoons for tapestry-weavers and, like all 16th-century court artists, was called upon to design elaborate ephemeral decorations for masques and fêtes, which survive only in preparatory drawings and, sometimes, engravings. Francis I trusted his eye and sent him back to Italy on buying trips in 1540 and again in 1545.

In Rome, part of Primaticcio's commission was to take casts of the best Roman sculptures in the papal collections, some of which were cast in  bronze to decorate the parterres at Fontainebleau.

Primaticcio retained his position as court painter to Francis' heirs, Henry II and Francis II.  His masterpiece, the Salle d'Hercule at Fontainebleau, occupied him and his team from the 1530s to 1559.

Primaticcio's crowded Mannerist compositions and his long-legged canon of beauty influenced French art for the rest of the century.

Primaticcio turned to architecture towards the end of his life, his greatest work being the Valois Chapel at the Abbey of Saint-Denis, although this was not completed until after his death and was destroyed in 1719.

Gallery

Notes

References
The Oxford Dictionary of Art,

External links
Entry in 'Art-cyclopedia'
Château de Fontainebleau  (in English)
The engravings of Giorgio Ghisi, a full text exhibition catalog from The Metropolitan Museum of Art, which contains material on Francesco Primaticcio (see index)

1504 births
1570 deaths
Artists from Bologna
16th-century Italian painters
Italian male painters
Italian Mannerist painters
Italian Mannerist architects
Italian Mannerist sculptors
French Mannerist painters
French architects
French sculptors